Ukulele Songs is the second solo studio album by American singer and Pearl Jam frontman Eddie Vedder. It was released on May 31, 2011. The album is composed of original songs and new arrangements of several standards.

Cover art
The cover art features a photograph of the sculptural work "The Lost Correspondent" by Jason deCaires Taylor.  The sculpture is underwater with many others at a dive site called Moliniere Bay – Underwater Sculpture Park, Grenada.

Critical reception

The album has been met with generally favorable reviews and currently has a 68% rating on Metacritic. Rolling Stone magazine gave the album three and a half stars, saying "The ukulele doesn't allow for the widest range of expression, which makes it a challenging foil for Eddie Vedder, who never met a feeling he couldn't drive through a wall. But this uke-suffused album stands up because he adapts the instrument to his idiosyncratic needs."

Tours

Eddie Vedder did a solo tour through various parts of North America to promote the album, with support from Glen Hansard.

Vedder stated that the shows would be performed in smaller venues than those used by Pearl Jam. He cites this as a relief, as he claims "It's hard to be subtle when the back row of the crowd is 200 yards away". The tour began on June 15, 2011 and finished on July 16 in Seattle. The tour received positive reviews from critics.

In 2012 Vedder was scheduled to play shows across the Southern United States beginning in April. However, these dates were postponed until November, after Vedder suffered temporary nerve damage in his right arm after an earlier injury to his back. European shows started in July 2012, which included his first solo shows in the United Kingdom.

Track listing

Charts

Weekly charts

Year-end charts

Certifications

References

2011 albums
Eddie Vedder albums
Albums produced by Eddie Vedder
Albums produced by Adam Kasper
Folk rock albums by American artists
Monkeywrench Records albums